The Academia Venezolana de la Lengua (Spanish for Venezuelan Academy of Language) is an association of academics and experts on Venezuelan Spanish, the variant of the Spanish language in Venezuela. It was founded in Caracas on July 26, 1883. It is a member of the Association of Spanish Language Academies.

See also
 :Category:Members of the Venezuelan Academy of Language (includes past members)

External links
 List of current individual members

Spanish language academies
Venezuelan culture
Organizations established in 1883
1883 establishments in Venezuela